Oktyabrskaya Revolyutsiya class motorship is a class of Russian river passenger ships. It is named after the October Revolution.

Three-deck cargo-passenger ships built in Czechoslovakia, 1957–1962.

River cruise ships of the project 26-37

See also
 List of river cruise ships
 Rossiya class (project 785) motorship
 Rossiya class (project 1877) motorship
 Dmitriy Furmanov class motorship
 Baykal class motorship
 Rodina class motorship
 Anton Chekhov class motorship
 Vladimir Ilyich class motorship
 Maksim Gorkiy class motorship
 Sergey Yesenin class motorship

References

External links

 Тип Октябрьская Революция Проекты 26-37, 92-055 

River cruise ships
Ships of Russia
Ships of the Soviet Union
Czechoslovakia–Soviet Union relations